The 2007–08 Liga Premier, also known as the TM Liga Premier for sponsorship reasons, is the fifth season of the Liga Premier, the second-tier professional football league in Malaysia.

The season was held from 17 December 2007 and concluded in 3 May 2008. A total of 13 clubs compete in a single group format. Harimau Muda, a feeder team project for the Malaysia national football team, joined the league as preparation for the national competition. 

The Liga Premier champions for 2007–08 was Kuala Muda Naza. The club were promoted to 2009 Liga Super along with runners-up PLUS and third-place Kelantan.

League table

 Note: Originally only 2 clubs will be promoted to Liga Super, however FAM decided to promote third-place clubs in order to balance the number of team to compete in Liga Super and Liga Premier which is 14 clubs for the next season. This decision also affected the relegation as ATM will not be relegated for 2009 season and will be joined by two promoted clubs from Liga FAM, the MBJB and T-Team along with Sarawak which has been relegated from 2007–08 Liga Super.

Goalscorers

References

Malaysia Premier League seasons
2008 in Malaysian football
2007 in Malaysian football
Malay